Roffey is a suburb of Horsham in the south of England.

Roffey may also refer to:

 Roffey (electoral division) in Horsham, England
 Roffey, Yonne, a commune in north-central France
 Frederick Roffey (1895–unknown), Welsh rugby player
 Bill Roffey (1954– ), English footballer
 Monique Roffey (1965– ), writer
Sue Roffey, British and Australian psychologist and academic
Victor Roffey, (1908–1993), Australian aviator